A coracle is a small, rounded, lightweight boat of the sort traditionally used in Wales, and also in parts of the West Country and in Ireland, particularly the River Boyne, and in Scotland, particularly the River Spey. The word is also used of similar boats found in India, Vietnam, Iraq, and Tibet. The word coracle is an English spelling of the original Welsh , cognate with Irish and Scottish Gaelic , and is recorded in English text as early as the sixteenth century. Other historical English spellings include corougle, corracle, curricle and coricle.

Structure

The structure is made of a framework of split and interwoven willow rods, tied with willow bark. The outer layer was originally an animal skin such as horse or bullock hide (corium), with a thin layer of tar to waterproof it – today replaced by tarred calico, canvas, or fibreglass. The Vietnamese/Asian version of the coracle is made of interwoven bamboo and made water proof by using resin and coconut oil. Oval in shape and very similar to half a walnut shell, the coracle has a keel-less flat bottom to evenly spread the load across the structure and to reduce the required depth of water – often to only a few inches. This structure helps to make the boat more maneuverable and less likely to snag when used on narrow and/or shallow slow-running waterways.

Each coracle is tailored to the local river conditions. In general there is one design per river, but this is not always the case. The Teifi coracle, for instance, is flat-bottomed, as it is designed to negotiate shallow rapids, common on the river in the summer, while the Carmarthen coracle is rounder and deeper, because it is used in tidal waters on the Tywi, where there are no rapids. Teifi coracles are made from locally harvested wood – willow for the laths (body of the boat), hazel for the weave ( in Welsh – the bit round the top) – while Tywi coracles have been made from sawn ash for a long time. The working boats tend to be made from fibreglass these days. Teifi coracles use no nails, relying on the interweaving of the laths for structural coherence, whilst the Carmarthen ones use copper nails and no interweaving.

They are an effective fishing vessel because, when powered by a skilled person, they hardly disturb the water or the fish, and they can be easily manoeuvred with one arm, while the other arm tends to the net; two coracles to a net. The coracle is propelled by means of a broad-bladed paddle, which traditionally varies in design between different rivers. It is used in a sculling action, the blade describing a figure-of-eight pattern in the water. The paddle is used towards the front of the coracle, pulling the boat forward, with the paddler facing in the direction of travel.

History

Designed for use in swiftly flowing streams, the coracle has been in use in the British Isles for millennia, having been noted by Julius Caesar in his invasion of Britain in the mid first century BC, and used in his military campaigns in Spain. Remains interpreted as a possible coracle were found in an Early Bronze Age grave at Barns Farm near Dalgety Bay, and others have been described, from Corbridge and from near North Ferriby.

Where coracle fishing is performed by two coraclers the net is stretched across the river between the two coracles.  The coraclers will paddle one handed, dragging the net in the other, and draw the net downstream. When a fish is caught, each hauls up an end of the net until the two boats are brought to touch, and the fish is then secured, using a priest (or knocker – a small block of wood) to stun the fish.

A new tax was introduced in 1863 on the commercial capture of migratory fish in Wales; this led to a decline in the number of coracles. During the 1930s, the government decided to begin revoking the licences of commercial fisher families on the death of the main licensees. It took some years for this plan to be completed but eventually led to a more significant decline in the number of craft.     

In the 1920s and 30s James Hornell visited hundreds of rivers in the British Isles to talk with remaining coracle makers and users. He documented the tradition in his book British Coracles and the Curraghs of Ireland (The Society for Nautical Research, 1938) containing drawings, diagrams and construction details gleaned from regular makers.

Current Status
Coracles are now seen regularly only in tourist areas of West Wales, and irregularly in Shropshire on the River Severn—a public house in Sundorne, Shrewsbury called "The Coracle" has a pub sign featuring a man using a coracle on a river. The Welsh rivers Teifi and Tywi are the most common places to find coracles in Wales. On the Teifi they are most frequently seen between Cenarth, and Cilgerran and the village of Llechryd.

In 1974, a Welsh coracle piloted by Bernard Thomas (c. 1923–2014) of Llechryd crossed the English Channel to France in  hours. The journey was undertaken to demonstrate how the Bull Boats of the Mandan Indians of North Dakota could have been copied from coracles introduced by Prince Madog in the 12th century.

For many years until 1979, Shrewsbury coracle maker Fred Davies achieved some notability amongst football fans; he would sit in his coracle during Shrewsbury Town FC home matches at Gay Meadow, and retrieve stray balls from the River Severn. Although Davies died in 1994, his legend is still associated with the club.

The Coracle Society
The Coracle Society is a UK-based organisation was founded in 1990 by its former president, Sir Peter Badge (1921–2020). The five founding aims of the Society were:
To promote the knowledge of coracles, curraghs and allied craft, their making and use, and also their study and collection,
To take all reasonable steps to support the continuance of fishing involving the use of coracles and to encourage the holding of coracle regattas, races and the like,
To publish a newsletter as a means of communication between all those interested in coracles,
To use its best endeavours to obtain supplies of materials for the construction of coracles, and
To promote demonstrations, courses, exhibitions, discussions and lectures relating to coracles.

The current president of the Society is Irving Finkel, Assistant Keeper in the Department of the Middle East at the British Museum, who is known for decoding a cuneiform tablet detailing Noah's Ark – the description of which resembles a very large coracle. The current Society chairperson is Jude Pilgrim, a committee member of the Heritage Lottery Fund. She recently played an instrumental part in setting up the Ironbridge Coracle Trust, formed to save the Eustace Rogers coracle hut in Ironbridge from demolition.

There are many Society members across the country who demonstrate at events and/or run coracle building courses, helping meet the Society's founding aims. A list of some of this year's events can be found on the official Coracle Society website.

The Society was present at the 2005 Shrewsbury River Festival, where they displayed various coracles on the River Severn. There is also an annual coracle regatta held in Ironbridge on the August Bank Holiday Monday every year. Organised by the Green Wood Centre until 2014 and the Ironbridge Coracle Trust from 2015, it is run on an informal basis whereby anyone with a coracle can take part in the event. Each year new entrants come with coracles made on the Bank Holiday weekend at the Green Wood Centre.

Members of the Society support the annual world championship coracle races in Shrewsbury, which raises funds in support of Macmillan Cancer Support.

In 2010, the Society celebrated its 20th anniversary with a number of events, including a morning of talks at the National Coracle Centre in Cenarth. In 2015, the Society celebrated its 25th anniversary at its founding home of St Fagans National History Museum. Events included a talk from Irving Finkel about his experiences decoding the Noah tablet and making the accompanying Channel 4 documentary. The Society also supported the return of coracles and coracle regattas to Welshpool in 2015.

Safety
The design of the coracle makes it an unstable craft. Because it sits "on" the water, rather than "in" it, the vessel can easily be carried by currents and the wind. The Coracle Society has published guidelines for safely using coracles.

Similar craft

The oldest instructions yet found for construction of a coracle are contained in precise directions on a four-thousand-year-old cuneiform tablet supposedly dictated by the Mesopotamian god Enki to Atra-Hasis on how to build a round "ark". The tablet is about 2,250 years older than previously discovered accounts of flood myths, none of which contain such details.

The Irish  (also  or ) is a similar, but larger, vessel still in use today. Curachs were also used in the west of Scotland:

The currachs in the River Spey were particularly similar to Welsh coracles. Other related craft include:

 India – 
 Iraq –  or 
 Native American societies – bull boat
 Tibet – ku-dru and kowas
 Vietnam –  or

Indian coracle 
Indian coracles ('crab') are commonly found on the rivers Kaveri and Tungabhadra in Southern India. Coracles are light, bowl-shaped boats with a frame of woven grasses, reeds, or saplings covered with hides. Indian coracles are considered to have been in existence since prehistoric times, and are a major tourist attraction at the Hogenakkal falls on the Kaveri river. Although these boats were originally designed for general transport, they have recently been used mostly for giving tourists rides.

Types
The coracles found in the Hogenakkal are of two types, which differ mainly in size. The smaller ones are about 6.2 feet (1.9 metres) in diameter, and are used primarily for fishing. The larger ones, which measure up to 8.4 feet (2.6 metres) in diameter, are used for tourists.

Design
Indian coracles are either saucer or bowl shaped and circular, with the greatest diameter across the mouth. The circular coracles in Iraq are very similar, but they have convexly curved sides, and thus the mouth is not the widest part. Indian coracles are on average about 7.3 feet (2.24 metres) in diameter, but can still hold eight people at a time. Other kinds of coracles usually can only hold one person. Indian coracles, and coracles in general, are made of bamboo and take about a day to build, given all the necessary materials. The bottoms of the boats are covered in hides, or sometimes with sheets of plastic, in order to make them waterproof. In modern times, a sheet of LDPE plastic is often embedded between two layers of bamboo. Sometimes the bottom of the craft is tarred to make it waterproof. Coracles are steered and propelled using a single paddle from the front of the boat in the direction of travel, making them unique.

Construction
The boats are made primarily from bamboo. The first step in construction is a basic framework woven from bamboo sticks. Then the bottom is further reinforced with the addition of more bamboo sticks, making the boat's base sturdy. Once the bottom is structurally sound, the lowest points of the sides are defined by a circumferential band of three flat strips of bamboo woven into the existing lattice. The sides of the boat are then made with 20 to 30 adjacent strips of bamboo. Finally this framework is again strengthened by lightweight bamboo, making sure that the sides are not heavier than the base.

The boats had earlier been waterproofed by using hides of animals, but these days plastic sheets are used for this purpose as they are cheaper as well as easily available. The waterproofing is further enhanced by a layer of tar, a feature which is common in most contemporary coracles.

Local names
 , sometimes spelt  – Tamil
  or  – Kannada
  in Telugu
  in Malayalam

Iraqi coracle

They share details with the myriad types of coracle used across Eurasia. Modern  can be up to 18 feet (5.5 m) in diameter and carry four to five tons. Modern  are of similar size and construction as their ancient counterparts, with both being made from woven bundles of reeds or basketry waterproofed with bitumen.

Vietnamese coracle 
However, thuyen thung were probably strongly developed during the French colonial period, when the French colonialists imposed high taxes on seafaring, Local fishermen built coracles to avoid the French colonial regulations on boats.

See also
 Currach
 Fishing coracle
 Kuphar
 Kayak
 Umiak

References

External links

The official website of The Coracle Society
BBC Legacies – Coracles article
World of Boats (EISCA) Collection ~ Parisal from Tamil Nadu, Southern India
Historical note from the Coracle Society of Wales
Brief history and design principles

Indigenous boats
History of Wales
Transport in Wales
History of Shropshire
River Severn
Celtic culture